Events from the year 1986 in Denmark.

Incumbents
 Monarch - Margrethe II
 Prime minister - Poul Schlüter

Events

Undated

Sport
 30 March – 5 April – With three gold medals, three silver medals and three bronze medals, Denmark finishes as the best nation at the 10th European Badminton Championships in Uppsala, Sweden.

Badminton
 Gentofte BK wins Europe Cup.
 16 March  Morten Frost wins gold in men's sngiel at the 1986 All England Open Badminton Championships.

Cycling
 April – Kim Andersen wins Paris–Camembert.
 August – Jørgen Marcussen wins Trofeo Matteotti.
 Danny Clark (AUS) and Tony Doyle (GBR) win the Six Days of Copenhagen sox-day track cycling race.
 Denmark wins one gold medal, one silver medal and one bronze medal at thje 1986 UCI Track Cycling World Championships.

Births
 16 January – Hans-Kristian Vittinghus, badminton player
 12 May – Christinna Pedersen, badminton player

Deaths
1 April (in Canada) – Erik Bruhn, ballet dancer, choreographer, company director, actor (born 1928)
29 September – Prince George Valdemar of Denmark (born 1920)

See also
1986 in Danish television

References

 
Denmark
Years of the 20th century in Denmark
1980s in Denmark